Henry Weaver Farmstead is a historic home located at East Earl Township, Lancaster County, Pennsylvania. The house is a large, -story, "L"-shaped, limestone building with a steeply pitched gable roof. The roof is sheathed in tile laid in a side lap. It was built in at least two stages, with the oldest section dated to about 1761.  Also on the property are a contributing stone smokehouse and stone barn built in 1764.

It was listed on the National Register of Historic Places in 1978.

References

Houses on the National Register of Historic Places in Pennsylvania
Houses completed in 1761
Houses in Lancaster County, Pennsylvania
National Register of Historic Places in Lancaster County, Pennsylvania